Chuck Person's Eccojams Vol. 1 is an album by American electronic musician Daniel Lopatin under the pseudonym Chuck Person. A plunderphonics and chopped and screwed album, Eccojams Vol. 1 features songs that consist of looped samples from popular songs from the 1980s and 1990s, with effects such as pitch shifting being applied. The album has an overall mournful tone and often takes melancholic lyrics from the songs it samples.

Prior to Eccojams Vol. 1 release, Lopatin posted a series of videos he called "eccojams" to a YouTube channel named "sunsetcorp". The album was released under the label The Curatorial Club on August 8, 2010, with a run of 100 cassette tapes. An official remastered version was released for digital download in November 2016. Though obscure, it was used as a template for the genre of vaporwave and is thus widely considered to be influential to said genre. By the 2016 remaster's release, recognition for Eccojams Vol. 1 had grown, with the original tapes being sold off of Discogs for hundreds of dollars.

Background and release
Prior to the release of Chuck Person's Eccojams Vol. 1, Daniel Lopatin ran the YouTube channel Sunsetcorp. Lopatin's videos on Sunsetcorp, uploaded in 2009, consisted of what Lopatin called "eccojams", which are collages of slowed-down loops of reverberated 1980s' music excerpts and video clips taken from YouTube. Lopatin started creating the eccojams years prior to posting them on sunsetcorp because it was the type of music he could make while working at an office job. "Nobody Here" combines a looped sample from Chris de Burgh's "The Lady in Red" with a vintage computer-animated graphic called "Rainbow Road". Other examples include Fleetwood Mac's "Only Over You" for "Angel" and Roger Troutman's "Emotions" for "END OF LIFE ENTERTAINMENT SCENARIO #1". Some of these eccojams were collected and released as part of the 2009 audiovisual project Memory Vague under Lopatin's alias Oneohtrix Point Never.

Eccojams Vol. 1 served as an "elaboration on this [eccojams] technique". It was released under the label The Curatorial Club on cassette on August 8, 2010, with a limited run of 100 tapes. Its artwork incorporates fragments of the cover art for the 1992 video game Ecco the Dolphin such as "a distorted view of a rocky shoreline and a pixelated shark." Lopatin released an official remaster for digital download from his website on November 22, 2016, being available in MP3 and FLAC formats. It was eventually removed, likely because of copyright.

Composition

Eccojams Vol. 1 has been described as plunderphonics, chopped and screwed, and vaporwave. The tone of the album has been described as "dystopian", "unnerving, often mournful", "vast and mysterious", and "somber-yet-tropical". The songs consist of looped samples of popular songs from the 1980s and 1990s with added effects such as pitch shifting and reverb, a technique derived DJ Screw's chopped and screwed technique and likened to a "candy-coloured variation" of William Basinski's The Disintegration Loops. Most of the lyrics isolated in these loops are lyrics that differ from "overall tone and sentiment" of the original songs and often express negative feelings. An example would be "B4", which isolates the lyric "There's nobody here" from "The Lady in Red" to convey existentialism, which differs from the romantic tone of the original song.

"A1", which stretches and loops the lyric "Hurry boy, she’s waiting there for you" from Toto's "Africa", serves as the introduction. "A2" uses a phaser effect on "Only Over You". "A3" is a pitched-down looped sample of JoJo's "Too Little Too Late", creating "dense, compressed, overdubbed harmonies". "A4" samples a lyric from Michael Jackson's "Morphine" expressing horror at someone taking demerol. The lyric is warped, creating the impression that the listener is intoxicated, before a flanging effect is eventually applied. "A5", which samples a song by the Byrds, is described by Spectrum Culture as "a creepy little skit so blurred in effects as to be unrecognizable". "A6" is taken from Janet Jackson's "Lonely". "A7" is taken from Aphrodite's Child's "The Four Horsemen", "injecting a bit of apocalyptic dread". "A8", after an R&B loop, ends with a harsh noise, akin to a blizzard.

"B1" has a bleak tone, similar to a twisted dream, before transitioning to an uplifting loop of Kate Bush's voice from "Don't Give Up". "B2" is a "drunken, off-key" and slowed-down loop of "Gypsy". "B5" samples 2Pac's "Me Against the World". The final song, "B7", is a loop of "Woman in Chains" by Tears for Fears that has shimmering effect "approaching and receding" that eventually "overtakes the words" before the song fades out.

Reception and legacy

Though Eccojams Vol. 1 was released "with little fanfare", the videos that Lopatin posted on YouTube became relatively popular, with "Nobody Here" amassing 30 thousand views over several months. Music critic Simon Reynolds highlighted the videos' "conceptual framework" as "relat[ing] to cultural memory and the buried utopianism within capitalist commodities, especially those related to consumer technology in the computing and audio/video entertainment area". Anthony Fantano mentioned Eccojams Vol. 1 in his 2012 review of Macintosh Plus's Floral Shoppe as an album that he found to be "more bold with its editing and its looping and its stretching" of music samples.

According to Tiny Mix Tapes, Eccojams Vol 1 would lead to Lopatin's 2011 Oneohtrix Point Never album Replica. In 2012, Lopatin released a box set of four 7" singles titled Chuck Persons A.D.D., consisting of 30 eccojams. Each disc is designed to have grooves that would make them play infinitely. On the 2015 Oneohtrix Point Never album Garden of Delete, the song "ECCOJAMC1" was included as a tribute to Eccojams Vol. 1. In a 2013 Reddit Ask Me Anything (AMA), when inquired about a follow-up album to Eccojams Vol. 1, Lopatin revealed that he had many multiple eccojams in a "cryotank set to defrost in the distant future."

Retrospectively, Eccojams Vol. 1 is widely considered influential in vaporwave, a music genre characterized by slowing down samples from 1980s and 1990s' music. Released before the rise in popularity of vaporwave in 2012, the album would serve as a template for artists such as Vektroid to produce what would become vaporwave music. According to Stereogum Miles Bowe, vaporware artists "mash the chopped and screwed plunderphonics of Dan Lopatin...with the nihilistic easy-listening of James Ferraro’s Muzak-hellscapes on Far Side Virtual". In 2013, the music blog Girls Blood described Eccojams Vol. 1, along with Far Side Virtual and Skeleton's Holograms, as "Proto Vaporwave" in a post about "Vaporwave Essentials". Regarding the influx of vaporwave producers that came after Eccojams Vol. 1, Lopatin expressed in a 2017 AMA:
well - the entire point of eccojams was that it was a DIY practice that didnt involve any specialized music tech knowledge and for me it was a direct way of dealing with audio in a mutable, philosophical way that had very little to do with music and everything to do with FEELINGS and im happy to see that it actually turned out to be true, that people make the stuff and find connection and meaning through that PRACTICE is all i could ever hope for. its folk music now.

Though "relatively unacknowledged", by the time of the 2016 re-release, the original copies of Eccojams Vol. 1 were being sold on Discogs for a median cost of $250 and had grown in reputation. Kirk Bowman of SputnikMusic rated Eccojams Vol. 1 highly for its poignancy and found it to be a rare example of a repetitive album that he wanted to listen to repeatedly. Spectrum Culture lauded the album for "feel[ing] so vast and mysterious". Marvin Lin of Tiny Mix Tapes described the album as "plundering the depths of pop music and uncovering short musical segments or particularly existential lyrical moments" to create "a simple yet wholly ecstatic listening experience". Fact listed "A3" as among the best songs by Lopatin, Fantano ranked Eccojams Vol. 1 at number 153 on his list of best albums of the 2010s, and Tiny Mix Tapes named Eccojams Vol. 1 the number 1 album of the 2010s; Pat Beane stated it was because, "we at Tiny Mix Tapes couldn’t get enough of music. And Eccojams, of music, begat more music". In 2020, the 33⅓ series published a book of essays titled The 33 1⁄3 B-Sides, which included a piece on Eccojams Vol. 1 written by Lin.

Track listing
Adapted from the original cassette release. Samples adapted from lyrics.

Release history

Notes

References

Sources

External links
 
 

2010 albums
Oneohtrix Point Never albums
Vaporwave albums
Plunderphonics albums
Collage film